Uwe Leifeld (born 24 July 1966 in Münster) is a retired German football forward, who works as a scout with VfL Bochum .

Career

Statistics

References

External links
 

1966 births
Living people
German footballers
VfL Bochum players
FC Schalke 04 players
SC Preußen Münster players
Bundesliga players
Germany under-21 international footballers
Sportspeople from Münster
Association football forwards
Footballers from North Rhine-Westphalia